The Royal Deux-Ponts Regiment (or Royal German Regiment Zweibrücken) was a military unit which served France, raised in the Pfalz-Zweibrücken.  Christian IV, Count Palatine of Zweibrücken, raised and contracted the regiment to Louis XV of France in a 1751 subsidy treaty.

The Regiment served France in the Seven Years' War and the American Revolutionary War.  At the latter, it was commanded by the son of Christian IV, Christian of the Palatinate-Zweibrücken, who was with the regiment at the Siege of Yorktown.

France annexed Zweibrücken in 1797, and the Regiment was incorporated into the French Revolutionary Army and designated the 99th Infantry Regiment.

References

Sources
 
 
 

1757 establishments in the Holy Roman Empire
1791 disestablishments in France
Infantry regiments
Military units and formations established in 1757
Military units and formations of France in the American Revolutionary War
Military units and formations of the Early Modern period
Military units and formations disestablished in 1791